Stagefright is the second album released by the British heavy metal band Witchfynde. The album was released in October 1980 by Rondelet Records and re-released in 2005 by Lemon Recordings.

Track listing
All songs by Witchfynde, except tracks 1, 3, 5 by Bridges/Montalo/Scoresby and track 9 by Bridges/Montalo/Surgey

Personnel
Steve Bridges - lead vocals
Montalo - lead guitar
Pete Surgey - bass guitar
Gra Scoresby - drums, percussion

References

1980 albums
New Wave of British Heavy Metal albums